The lake Hvalvatn is situated east of Hvalfjörður in the western portion of Iceland. It lies to the east of the tuya Hvalfell .

Not far from Hvalvatn is Glymur, the second highest waterfall in the country. Hiking trails lead both to the lake and to the waterfall.

See also
 List of lakes of Iceland
 Waterfalls of Iceland

External links
Iceland Travel Guide

Lakes of Iceland